Marco Island Academy is a public charter high school (9-12) located in Marco Island, Collier County, Florida.

Clubs and honor societies 
Marco Island Academy hosts the following clubs and societies: Key Club, National Honor Society, Thespian Society, FCA, Video Game Club, Japanese Club, Culinary Club, Media (Yearbook and School Newspaper), Interact Club, History and Culture Club, Scholar Bowl, and Student Government.

Varsity sports 

Lacrosse for both boys and girls is an option for students at Lely High School.

Demographics 
Collier County Schools runs surveys quarterly on all schools in the district, here are the most recent (2018–19) demographics
Total Enrollment: 209

References

External links 
 CCPS Home Page

2011 establishments in Florida
Schools in Collier County, Florida
Educational institutions established in 2011